Frank Müller (born 18 June 1968 in Norden, Lower Saxony) is a retired male decathlete from Germany. He twice competed at the Summer Olympics for his native country (1992 and 1996). Müller set his personal best (8.256 points) in the men's decathlon on 22 July 2000 in Salzgitter.

Achievements

References
 

1968 births
Living people
People from Norden, Lower Saxony
Sportspeople from Lower Saxony
German decathletes
Athletes (track and field) at the 1992 Summer Olympics
Athletes (track and field) at the 1996 Summer Olympics
Olympic athletes of Germany